Borbetomagus is the debut studio album of Borbetomagus, released in 1980 by Agaric Records.

Track listing

Personnel 
Adapted from Borbetomagus liner notes.

Borbetomagus
 Don Dietrich – saxophone, design
 Brian Doherty – electronics
 Donald Miller – electric guitar
 Jim Sauter – saxophone

Production and additional personnel
 Joseph Quesada – engineer
 Michael "Maiden" Smirnoff – cover art

Release history

References

External links 
 

1980 debut albums
Borbetomagus albums